Pat Riordan (born 30 September 1979 in London, Canada) is a Canada rugby union player. He played club rugby for Burnaby Lake, and for the Canada national side, having also played at Pontypridd. Since making his international debut on June 14, 2003 in a match against England Saxons, he has made 43 appearances for his country, including appearing in all of Canada's matches in the 2007 World Cup.

Riordan captained the Canadian National Senior Men's Team from 2008 to 2011.

References

1979 births
Canadian rugby union players
Pontypridd RFC players
Rugby union hookers
Living people
Canada international rugby union players
Canadian expatriate sportspeople in Wales
Canadian expatriate rugby union players
Expatriate rugby union players in Wales